Lady is a Pirate is the début album by American independent singer Megan Slankard, released on July 18, 2001. Most of the tracks were recorded and produced by Megan while at her parents' house in Tracy, California with her brother, Tom. Additional recording was done with the help of Rich Talley, (who provides the bass track for many of the album tracks.) Additional album production work was done with the help of Megan's brother .

Track listing
 All songs written by Megan Slankard unless noted otherwise.
"Landed"  – 3:47  
"Practice Electra" – 3:07  
"Strictly Mr. T"  – 4:08  
"Damn You" – 4:15  
"Fly Now" – 4:30  
"Second Best"  – 3:52  
"Haven't Been Down"  – 4:30  
"Radio Blues"  – 5:46  
"Me Again"  – 4:16  
"The Feud" – 4:41 
"Company"  – 3:41 
"I Hoped You Would"  – 3:16 
"Lady Is A Pirate"  – 3:22

Personnel
Megan Slankard - Steel-string guitar, musical arranger, vocals
Rich Talley, Bass guitar
Tom W. Slankard, co-producer

External links
 [ All Music Guide Lady is a Pirate album page]

2001 debut albums
Megan Slankard albums